Vivian Heisen (born 27 December 1993) is a German professional tennis player.

She is a doubles specialist who reached her career-high WTA doubles ranking of world No. 61 in April 2022.

Career
Heisen made her WTA Tour main-draw debut at the 2019 Morocco Open in the doubles competition where she and partner Johanna Larsson lost to María José Martínez Sánchez and Sara Sorribes Tormo.

She reached her maiden doubles final at the WTA 500 2022 Sydney Tennis Classic partnering Panna Udvardy.

Doubles performance timeline

Only WTA Tour and Grand Slam tournament results are considered in the win-loss statistics.

Current through the 2023 Linz Open.

WTA career finals

Doubles: 1 (1 runner-up)

WTA Challenger finals

Doubles: 1 (1 runner-up)

ITF Circuit finals

Singles: 5 (2 titles, 3 runner–ups)

Doubles: 19 (10 titles, 9 runner–ups)

References

External links
 
 

1993 births
Living people
German female tennis players
People from Ammerland
Tennis people from Lower Saxony
21st-century German women